Gilles de Bins dit Binchois (also Binchoys;  – 20 September 1460) was a Franco-Flemish composer of early Renaissance music. A central figure of the Burgundian School, Binchois and his colleague Guillaume Du Fay were deeply influenced by the contenance angloise style of John Dunstaple. His efforts in consolidating a 'Burgundian tradition' would be important for the formation of the Franco-Flemish School. One of the three most famous composers of the early 15th century, Binchois is often ranked behind Du Fay and Dunstable by contemporary scholars, but his works were still widely cited, emulated and used as source material after his death.

Described by the musicologist Anthony Pryer as a "supreme miniaturist", he generally avoided large scale works, and is most admired for his shorter secular chansons. Despite this, it is thought that considerably more of his sacred music survives than secular music, creating a 'paradoxical image' of the composer. Reflecting on his style, the Encyclopædia Britannica comments that "Binchois cultivated the gently subtle rhythm, the suavely graceful melody, and the smooth treatment of dissonance of his English contemporaries".

Life and career

Early life
The composer's full name is Gilles de Bins dit Binchois, consisting of the byname 'Gilles de Binche' (also spelled 'Gilles de Bins') and the dit name Binchois (also spelled 'Binchoys'). Obituary records from St Vincent, Soignies name his parents as Johannes and Johanna de Binche, usually identified with Jean de Binch (?) and his wife Jeanne, née Paulouche (?). His parents were of the upper class in Mons and probably from the town of Binche; his father was a councillor to Duke William IV of Hainault and later Jacqueline, Countess of Hainaut. The elder Binchois was also a councillor for the Ste Waudru church of Mons, and built a chapel for the St Germain church. Their son Gilles Binchois was probably born in Mons, the same city in which the composer Orlande de Lassus would be born a century later.

Nothing for certain is known about Binchois until 8 December 1419, when he is known to have been the organist at Ste Waudru in Mons. It is possible that Gilles Binchois received an early musical education near the court of Mons, and like other composers of his time, he probably trained as a chorister in his youth, perhaps at St Germain. There is no evidence that Binchois was a chorister at Cambrai in his youth.

Records from 28 July 1423 indicates that he soon moved to Lille. Around this time he may have been a soldier, as indicated by a line in the funeral motet Deploration for Binchois, composed in his memory by Johannes Ockeghem. Binchois might have served under the Englishman William de la Pole, 1st Duke of Suffolk, who was in France for the Hundred Years' War. This association is evidenced by a 1426 document which records that the Duke of Suffolk commissioned the otherwise unknown rondel Ainsi que a la foiz m’y souvient from a 'Binchoiz'.

Burgundian court

Sometime during the late 1420s Binchois joined the court chapel choir of Burgundy; the exact date is unknown due to chapel's lost employment records from 1419 to 1436. A 1427 disposition from Guillaume Benoit which includes Binchois' name suggests he was there by then, though this is uncertain. He was certainly in the chapel when he wrote Nove cantum melodie—one of his only datable compositions—on the 18th of January 1431, as it was for the baptism of Anthony, bastard of Burgundy. The musicologist Fallows notes that "he must have been there some years earlier since the list of 1436 places him as fifth chaplain in order of seniority within the choir". The Burgundian court under Philip the Good was perhaps the most lively and prominent court of the area; its members compared it to that of Alexander The Great. The musicologist Reinhard Strohm commented that Philip's  court of "eclectic and flamboyant culture typified the feudal aspirations of the age". 

Among the residents of the court was the painter Jan van Eyck, who, according to the art historian Erwin Panofsky, may have portrayed Binchois in the Léal Souvenir portrait, though there is no widespread agreement for this. Binchois was associated with the leading composer of his day, Guillaume Du Fay. They likely met during a meeting at Chambéry of the Burgundian and Savoy courts in February 1434. However, the only certain meeting of the composers was in March 1449, when Du Fay resided with Binchois in Mons for a convocation of canons. Aside from Du Fay, important composer contemporaries of Binchois included John Dunstaple, Lionel Power, Hugo de Lantins and Arnold de Lantins.

The Burgundian chapel choir was unique in allowing its members to become clergy without being ordained as a priest; in 1437 Binchois became a subdeacon. Probably due to Philip's favor, he held prebends for at least four churches until his death: St Donatian, Bruges (from 7 January 1430); Ste Waudru, Mons (from 17 May 1437); St Vincent, Soignies (from 1452); and St Pierre, Cassel (from 21 May 1459). He was also made honorary court secretary in 1437 by Phillip, who paid for a now-lost work by him on 29 May 1438, Passions en nouvelle maniere. It is possible that Binchois had some experience in medicine, since he attended to a duchess's toothache in July 1437. The choir's attendance records are fairly thorough, and indicate that Binchois did not travel much on his own.

Final Soignies years
He eventually retired in Soignies by February 1453, receiving a substantial pension until his death, presumably for his long years of excellent service to the Burgundian court. In 1452 he became provost of the collegiate church of St Vincent. Around this time Soignies grew its reputation for musical excellence; Guillaume Malbecque and Johannes Regis were active there, while the contemporary writers Jacobus Lessabaeus and Lodovico Guicciardini praised the town's musical standard. Binchois may have been involved in the well known 1454 Feast of the Pheasant in Lille, as the motet Lamentatio sanctae matris ecclesiae Constantinopolitanae was performed, which may be by Binchois, but is usually ascribed to Du Fay. On 20 September 1460 Binchois died in Soignies; his will mentions otherwise unknown family members, including his brothers Andri de Binch and Ernoul de Binch. Upon his death Ockeghem wrote a deploration, Mort, tu as navré de ton dart, and Fallows has suggested that Du Fay composed the rondeau En triumphant in 1460 for his colleague's death.

Music

Binchois is often considered to be among finest melodists of the 15th century; reflecting on his style the Encyclopædia Britannica comments that "Binchois cultivated the gently subtle rhythm, the suavely graceful melody, and the smooth treatment of dissonance of his English contemporaries". His tunes appeared in copies decades after his death, and were often used as sources for Mass composition by later composers. Most of his secular songs are rondeaux, which became the most common song form during the century. Binchois' melodies are generally independent of the rhyme scheme of the verses they are set to, an approach which was uncommon by 15th century European composers.

Like Du Fay, Binchois was deeply influenced by the contenance angloise style of the English composer John Dunstaple. The court of Philip had generally good relations with the English, and had established both diplomatic and cultural links with their northern neighbor; his court was open to English diplomats, businessmen and musicians.

About half of his extant secular music is found in the manuscript Oxford, Bodleian Library MS Canon. misc. 213.

Legacy
Modern musicologists generally hold Binchois, along with Du Fay and John Dunstable as the three major European composers of the early 15th-century. Binchois, however, is usually ranked below the other two. Du Fay is often considered the leading European composer of his lifetime, and both had a longer career and produced more works than Binchois. While Dunstaple was described by the musicologist Margaret Bent as "probably the most influential English composer of all time." Reflecting on this, Fallows contends that regardless, "the extent to which [Binchois's] works were borrowed, cited, parodied and intabulated in the later 15th century implies that he had more direct influence than either [Du Fay or Dunstaple]".

The 20th century saw two major publications of music by Binchois: the musicologist Wolfgang Rehm edited a 1957 edition of his secular works, while a 1992 edition of his religious music was edited by Philip Kaye.

References

Notes

Citations

Sources

Further reading

External links

 
 
 

1460 deaths
Belgian classical composers
Belgian male classical composers
Burgundian school composers
15th-century Franco-Flemish composers
Renaissance composers
Year of birth uncertain